Tân Hiệp is a rural district of Kiên Giang province in the Mekong River Delta region of Vietnam.

Divisions
The district is divided into the following communes:

Tân Hiệp, Tân Hiệp A, Tân Hiệp B, Tân An, Tân Thành, Tân Hội, Thạnh Đông, Thạnh Đông A, Thạnh Đông B and Thạnh Trị.

As of 2003 the district had a population of 147,821. The district covers an area of 416.5 km². The district capital lies at Tân Hiệp.

References

Districts of Kiên Giang province